

St. Francis Xavier Church is a Catholic church at 30–36 West 16th Street, between Fifth Avenue and Avenue of the Americas (Sixth Avenue), in the Flatiron District of Manhattan, New York City. It is administered by the Society of Jesus.

History
The original church was founded in 1851 by Jesuits from the village of Fordham. Its original sanctuary, designed by William Rodrigue, was the scene of a panic on March 8, 1877, when someone shouted "Fire!" in the church during mass; seven people died. This church was torn down in 1878.

Architecture
The cornerstone of the new church was laid in May 1878 on land immediately to the west of the old church. Built over the next four years, the current church has been in use since 1882. Designed by Irish-born architect Patrick Charles Keely in a "Roman Basilica" style—the church has a Neo-baroque exterior with a façade of bluish-gray granite quarried from Monson, Massachusetts, by the W.N. Flynt Granite Co. The main entrance is sheltered by a arcaded portico. The stained-glass windows in a pre-Raphaelite style are by the Morgan brothers, frequent collaborators of Keely. The church was dedicated by Archbishop Michael Corrigan on December 3, 1882.

A campaign for the extensive restoration and preservation of the church began in 2001 and was completed in 2010 under the direction of EverGreene Architectural Arts and Thomas A. Fenniman, architect.

See also
Xavier High School (New York City)

References
Notes

External links

Official website

Roman Catholic churches completed in 1882
19th-century Roman Catholic church buildings in the United States
Roman Catholic Archdiocese of New York
Roman Catholic churches in Manhattan
Cultural history of New York City
Flatiron District